Masudi or Masoodi may refer to:

Al-Masudi (c. 896–956), Arab historian, geographer and traveler, Arab historian
Masudi, Khuzestan, a village in Khuzestan Province, Iran
Masudi 2, a village in Khuzestan Province, Iran
Masudi Al Safar, a village in Khuzestan Province, Iran
Masudi, South Khorasan, a village in South Khorasan Province, Iran

See also
Messaoudi